InSatDb is a database of microsatellites  of sequenced insect genomes

See also
 microsatellite

References

External links
 http://www.cdfd.org.in/insatdb

Entomological databases
Insect genes
Repetitive DNA sequences
Genome databases